S. Retnaraj was an Indian politician and former Member of the Legislative Assembly. He was elected to the Tamil Nadu legislative assembly as a Dravida Munnetra Kazhagam candidate from Colachel constituency in 1980 election and Nagercoil constituency in the 1984 election.

He was one of the founding member of Marumalarchi Dravida Munnetra Kazhagam.

References 

Dravida Munnetra Kazhagam politicians
Year of birth missing (living people)
Possibly living people

Tamil Nadu MLAs 1985–1989